Pusiola theresia is a moth in the subfamily Arctiinae. It was described by Sergius G. Kiriakoff in 1963. It is found in the Democratic Republic of the Congo.

References

Moths described in 1963
Lithosiini
Moths of Africa